Mornington Cemetery is a cemetery serving the Mornington Peninsula area of Melbourne. It is located at 40 Craigie Rd, Mount Martha.

The cemetery was first Surveyed in 1855, and was originally called the Mt. Martha Cemetery, then the Moorooduc Cemetery. It contains a number of pioneer graves for the district.

Notable Interments
 Sheree Beasley – Murder victim
 Keith Miller AM MBE – Test Cricketer

War graves
The cemetery contains the war graves of 3 Commonwealth service personnel from World War I.

References

External links
 
 there-is-no-proof-that-mornington-cemetery-victoria-australia-was-originally-called-the-mount-martha-cemetery
  
 
 
1855 establishments in Australia
Cemeteries in Melbourne
Buildings and structures in the Shire of Mornington Peninsula